Bhupendra Bahadur Thapa is a Nepalese politician serving as the Member Of House Of Representatives (Nepal) elected from Myagdi, Province No. 4. He is the member of the Presidium of Nepal Communist Party.

References

Living people
Nepal MPs 2017–2022

Communist Party of Nepal (Unified Marxist–Leninist) politicians
1967 births
People from Myagdi District